The 2018–19 Australian Athletics Championships was the 97th edition of the national championship in outdoor track and field for Australia. It was held from 4–7 April 2019 at the Sydney Olympic Park Athletic Centre in Sydney. It served as the selection meeting for Australia at the 2019 World Athletics Championships. Distance events were held separately, with the 10,000 metres taking place at the Zatopek 10K on 13 December 2018 at Lakeside Stadium in Melbourne, the mile run taking place at the Albie Thomas meet at the Crest Athletic Centre in Bankstown on 22 December 2018, and the 5000 metres taking place at the Sydney Track Classic on 23 February 2019.

Medal summary

Men

Women

References

External links 
 Athletics Australia website

2019
Australian Athletics Championships
Australian Championships
Athletics Championships
Sports competitions in Sydney
2010s in Sydney